Dreamland or Dream Land may refer to:

Arts, entertainment and media

Film
 Dreamland (2006 film), an American drama
 Dreamland (2007 film), an American science fiction film
 Dreamland (2009 film), an Icelandic documentary
 Dreamland (2016 film), an American comedy-drama 
 Dreamland (2019 American film), an American drama thriller film with Finn Cole and Margot Robbie
 Dreamland (2019 Canadian film), a Canadian fantasy film directed by Bruce McDonald
 Dreamland: The Burning of Black Wall Street, a 2021 American documentary film

Television
 Dreamland (TV series), an upcoming British comedy television series
 Utopia (Australian TV series), a 2014 comedy renamed Dreamland for non-Australian audiences
 Dreamland (Doctor Who), a 2009 animated serial based on Doctor Who
 "Dreamland" (The X-Files), a 1998 sixth-season episode 
 "Dreamland", the title of season 8 of Archer

Gaming
 Kirby's Dream Land, a 1992 video game

Literature
 Dreamland (Baker novel), a 1999 historical novel by Kevin Baker
 Dreamland (Dessen novel), a 2000 teen novel by Sarah Dessen
 Dreamland, a book series by Dale Brown, and the title of the first book
 Dreamland, a novel series by Jody Lynn Nye
 "Dreamland", an 1882 poem by Lewis Carroll
 "Dream-Land", an 1844 poem by Edgar Allan Poe
 Dreamland: A Self-Help Manual for a Frightened Nation, a 2006 non-fiction book by Andri Snær Magnason
 Dreamland: The True Tale of America's Opiate Epidemic, a 2015 non-fiction book by Sam Quinones
 Dreamlands, a fictional location in the work of H. P. Lovecraft

Music

Albums
 Dreamland (Aztec Camera album), 1993
 Dreamland (Beat Circus album), 2008
 Dreamland (Black Box album), 1990
 Dreamland (Glass Animals album), 2020
 Dreamland (Joni Mitchell album), 2004
 Dreamland (Madeleine Peyroux album), 1996
 Dreamland (Robert Miles album), 1996
 Dreamland (Robert Plant album), 2002
 Dreamland (Yellowjackets album), 1995
 Dreamland (Wild Belle album), 2016
 Dreamland, a 2020 album by COIN
 Dreamland, a 2004 album by Dale Watson

Songs
 "Dreamland" (Bennie K song), 2005 
 "Dreamland" (Pet Shop Boys song), 2019 
 "Dreamland", a 1992 song by The B-52s from the album Good Stuff
 "Dreamland", a 2004 song by Bruce Hornsby from the album Halcyon Days
 "Dreamland", a 1998 song by HammerFall from the album Legacy of Kings
 "Dreamland", a 1976 song by Roger McGuinn from the album Cardiff Rose
 "Dreamland", a 1977 song by Joni Mitchell from the album Don Juan's Reckless Daughter
 "Dreamland", a 2011 song by Lillix
 "Dreamland", a 2009 song by Émilie Simon
 "Dream Land", a 2013 song by Perfume from Level3

Places

Amusement parks
 Dreamland (Coney Island, 1904), in Brooklyn, New York, United States
 Dreamland (Coney Island, 2009), in Brooklyn, New York, United States
 Dreamland (Melbourne amusement park), in Australia
 Dreamland Margate, in Kent, United Kingdom
 Dream Land Isfahan, in Iran
 Nara Dreamland, near Nara, Japan
 Seabreeze Amusement Park in Rochester, New York, United States, known as Dreamland from the 1940s to the 1970s
 Yokohama Dreamland, in Yokohama, Japan

Other places
 Dreamland, Michigan, United States
 Dreamland (Egypt), a private urban development
 Dreamland (Fallujah, Iraq), a former U.S. military base 
 Dreamland Ballroom, a music venue in Omaha, Nebraska, United States
 Dreamland Beach, in Bali, Indonesia
 Dreamland Rink, an entertainment venue in San Francisco
 Area 51, also known as Dreamland, a United States Air Force facility in Nevada

Other uses
 Dreamland Bar-B-Que, a chain of restaurants in Alabama and Georgia, U.S.
 Dreamland Recording Studios, in Hurley, New York, U.S.

See also

 Dreamworld (disambiguation)
 Graceland (disambiguation)
 Dreamlanders, the cast and crew of regulars whom John Waters has used in his films
 The Dreamland Chronicles, fantasy webcomic and comic book series
 Dreamland Egypt Classic, a former tennis tour series